The Tragedy of Pompey the Great is a play by John Masefield, based on the career of the Roman general and politician Pompey the Great. 

The play premiered at the Aldwych Theatre on 4 December 1910 and was first published in 1914.  The play was later filmed for television in 1950 for the BBC Sunday Night Theatre.

References

External links
The Tragedy of Pompey the Great at IMDb
The Tragedy of Pompey the Great at BFI

Plays set in ancient Rome
Plays based on real people
Biographical plays about politicians
Biographical plays about military leaders
1910 plays
Cultural depictions of Pompey
Plays set in the 1st century BC